TKOH may refer to:

Take On Helicopters, a video game developed by Bohemia Interactive
Tseung Kwan O Hospital, a hospital in Tseung Kwan O, Hong Kong, China